A cap is a form of headgear.

Cap may refer to:

Arts and entertainment
 Cap, a character in the comic strip Cap Stubbs and Tippie
 The Cap, a 1984 Canadian short film
 "Cap" (song), a song by KSI featuring Offset from the 2020 album Dissimulation

Health and medicine 

 Cervical cap, a barrier method of contraception
 Crown (dentistry), a type of dental restoration

People
 Cap (nickname), a list of people
 Čáp, a list of people with the Czech surname
 Vladislao Cap (1934–1982), Argentine footballer
 Cap R. Carden (1866–1935), American politician

Places
 Cap Point, Saint Lucia
 Cap River, New Caledonia
 El Capitan, or "El Cap", a rock formation in Yosemite National Park
 Nga Ying Chau or Cap Island, a former island in Hong Kong

Science and technology
 Cap set, in affine geometry
 CAP theorem, related to properties of distributed data stores
 Capricornus, an astronomical constellation, whose stars are abbreviated β Cap, δ Cap, etc.
 Five-prime cap, a special nucleotide added to the 5′ end of some eukaryotic mRNA molecules
 Pileus (mycology), the cap of a mushroom or related fungi
 Cap, a piping and plumbing fitting
 Armor-piercing cap (often known simply as a 'cap'), a metal cover on an armor-piercing projectile meant to protect the penetrator and improve armor-penetrating capabilities.

Sports
 Cap (sport), a term for an athlete's appearance at international level
 Salary cap, an agreement limiting money spent on players' salaries

Other uses
 Cap (crown), the cap which fills the inner space of modern crowns
 Cap, a winemaking term
 Cap, or Camper shell, a covering for the rear bed of a pickup truck
 Cap Radio (Morocco), a Moroccan radio station
 Chipaya language, ISO 639-3 language code cap
 Combat air patrol, a type of flying mission for military aircraft
 Closure (container), often referred to as a cap

See also
 
 
 CAP (disambiguation)
 Caps (disambiguation)
 Capp (disambiguation)
 CAPPE (disambiguation)
 Market capitalization (market cap), the market value of a publicly traded company's outstanding shares
 Interest rate cap, a type of interest rate derivative
 Blasting cap, an explosive detonator
 Percussion cap, a single-use ignition device on muzzleloader firearms